William Griffiths Newton (1900 – 3 May 1965) was an English footballer who played at left-back for Port Vale, Congleton Town, and Oswestry Town.

Career
Newton played for Red Street P.S.A. before joining Port Vale as an amateur in March 1922, signing professional forms in June 1923. His only Second Division appearance was in a 2–1 win at Crystal Palace on 25 August 1923. He was transferred to Congleton Town in February 1924, and later turned out for Oswestry Town.

Career statistics
Source:

References

1900 births
1965 deaths
Sportspeople from Crewe
English footballers
Association football fullbacks
Port Vale F.C. players
Oswestry Town F.C. players
Congleton Town F.C. players
English Football League players